The Lower Mamberamo languages are a recently proposed language family linking two languages spoken along the northern coast of Papua province, Indonesia, near the mouth of the Mamberamo River. They have various been classified either as heavily Papuanized Austronesian languages belonging to the SHWNG branch, or as Papuan languages that had undergone heavy Austronesian influence. Glottolog 3.4 classifies Lower Mamberamo as Austronesian, while Donohue classifies it as Papuan. Kamholz (2014) classifies Warembori and Yoke each as coordinate primary subgroups of the South Halmahera–West New Guinea languages.

Languages
The two languages, Warembori and Yoke, were listed as isolates in Stephen Wurm's widely used classification. Donohue (1998) showed them to be related with shared morphological irregularities. Ross (2007) classified Warembori as an Austronesian language based on pronouns; however, Donohue argues that these are borrowed, since the two pronouns most resistant to borrowing, 'I' and 'thou', do not resemble Austronesian or any other language family. The singular prefixes resemble Kwerba languages, but Lower Mamberamo has nothing else in common with that family. (See Warembori language and Yoke language for details.) Donohue argues that they form an independent family, though one perhaps related to another Papuan family, that has been extensively relexified under Austronesian influence, especially in the case of Warembori.

Pauwi, now extinct, may have been a Lower Mamberamo language.

'Ambermo'
In 1855, G. J. Fabritius collected numerals from around Geelvink Bay. At the 'Ambermo' (Mamberamo) River at the eastern extent of his coverage, he collected  '1' and  '2' from an unnamed language. In any case, these words do not resemble the numerals in any language of the area, so the language Fabritius encountered remains unidentified.

Pronouns
Reconstructed independent pronouns in proto-Lower Mamberamo are:

{| 
!  !! sg !! pl
|-
! 1
|  || 
|-
! 2
|  || 
|-
! 3
|  || 
|}

Foley observes that there are likely similarities with Austronesian languages, likely due to contact.

 'I' and  'you (sg)' are also shared with neighboring Kwerba languages.

Cognates
Basic vocabulary, mostly cognates, of the Lower Mamberamo languages (Warembori and Yoke) listed in Foley (2018):

{| 
|+ Lower Mamberamo family basic vocabulary
! gloss !! Warembori !! Yoke !! notes
|-
| 'bird' ||  ||  || < Austronesian
|-
| 'bone' ||  ||  || 
|-
| 'eat' ||  ||  || < Austronesian ?
|-
| 'egg' ||  ||  || 
|-
| 'give' ||  ||  || 
|-
| 'go' ||  ||  || < Austronesian ?
|-
| 'hair' ||  ||  || < Austronesian
|-
| 'hear' ||  ||  || 
|-
| 'kill' ||  ||  || < Austronesian
|-
| 'leg' ||  ||  || 
|-
| 'louse' ||  ||  || < Austronesian ?
|-
| 'man' ||  ||  || 
|-
| 'name' ||  ||  || 
|-
| 'tree' ||  ||  || < Austronesian
|}

Vocabulary comparison
The following basic vocabulary words are from Voorhoeve (1975), as cited in the Trans-New Guinea database:

{| class="wikitable sortable"
! gloss !! Warembori !! Yoke
|-
! head
|  || 
|-
! hair
|  || 
|-
! eye
|  || 
|-
! tooth
|  || 
|-
! leg
|  || 
|-
! louse
|  || 
|-
! dog
|  || 
|-
! pig
|  || 
|-
! bird
|  || 
|-
! egg
|  || 
|-
! blood
|  || 
|-
! bone
|  || 
|-
! skin
|  || 
|-
! tree
|  || 
|-
! man
|  || 
|-
! sun
|  || ; 
|-
! water
|  || ; 
|-
! fire
|  || 
|-
! stone
|  || 
|-
! name
|  || 
|-
! eat
|  || 
|-
! one
|  || 
|-
! two
|  || 
|}

Notes

References

See also
South Halmahera–West New Guinea languages
Papuan languages

External links
Lower Mamberamo languages database at TransNewGuinea.org

 
Proposed language families
Papuan languages
Mixed languages